The Hero Women's Indian Open (named after sponsor Hero) is a golf tournament on the Ladies European Tour. It is played at the DLF Golf and Country Club in Gurgaon, India.

Tournament name through the years:
2007–2009: DLF Women's Indian Open
2010: Hero Honda Women's Indian Open
2011–2022: Hero Women's Indian Open

Winners

Source:

References

External links
Coverage on the Ladies European Tour's official site

Ladies European Tour events
Ladies Asian Golf Tour events
Golf tournaments in India
Recurring sporting events established in 2007
Hero Group